Opened in 1969, Georgia Diagnostic and Classification Prison (GDCP) is a Georgia Department of Corrections prison for men in unincorporated Butts County, Georgia, near Jackson. The prison holds the state execution chamber. The execution equipment was moved to the prison in June 1980, with the first execution in the facility occurring on December 15, 1983. The prison houses the male death row (UDS, "under death sentence"), while female death row inmates reside in Arrendale State Prison.

The prison, the largest in the state, consists of eight cellblocks containing both double-bunked and single-bunked cells. There are also eight dormitories and a medical unit. The prison conducts diagnostic processing for the state correctional system, houses male offenders under death sentence (UDS), and carries out state-ordered executions by lethal injection. The prison complex also contains a special management unit that houses some of the most aggressive and dangerous prisoners in the correctional system.

Diagnostics and Classification
The Georgia Diagnostic and Classification Prison serves as a central hub where sentenced felons begin the process of being admitted into the Georgia State Correctional System. Numerous county jails are paid by the state to house sentenced felons until space becomes available in the prison system. Sentenced felons may spend years in local jails until housing space becomes available in the state prison system. While at GDCP, inmates are either in the process of being classified and tested, or they are assigned as a "permanent." Those inmates who are 'permanents' will serve their entire sentence at the GDCP, while the remainder of inmates will be tested and then moved to other prisons based on their classifications.
Based on published research statistics by the Georgia Department of Corrections, inmates who are being diagnosed and classified undergo a battery of tests and diagnostic questionnaires. Tests and diagnostic notations include: the culture fair IQ test; Wide Range Achievement Test (WRAT) (reading, math, and spelling); scope of substance abuse (summary & detailed report); latest mental health treatment; PULHESDWIT medical scale; criminality, alcoholism, and/or drug abuse in immediate family; one or both parents absent during childhood; manipulative or assaultive tendency diagnostics; and criminal history report with prior incarcerations and a full account of all previous and current offenses.

Death Row
Georgia Department of Corrections male Death Row (Under Death Sentence - UDS) inmates are housed at the GDCP. The latest report shows a total of thirty-nine (39) male felons currently housed on Georgia's Death Row. Women under the sentence of death are housed at the Arrendale State Prison.

The site of execution was moved from the Georgia State Prison to GDCP in June 1980, and a new electric chair was installed in place of the previous one, which was moved to a display at the Georgia State Prison. On December 15, 1983 the first execution at GDCP occurred.

"Death House"
The "Death House" is an isolated structure where state ordered executions are carried out. The "house" is a single-entrance fortified building, accessed only through the prison yard. Upon entry to the Death House, witnesses to executions are immediately located in an observation room, approximately 20' X 20' (6 m X 6 m), with three 16' (4.9 m) long wooden benches to seat them. When seated,  a glass window is seen directly in front of the first row of benches. An access door to the left of the viewing window leads to the execution room.  Immediately to the right of the observation room (but still within it) is a storage area that houses the non-functional electric chair (nicknamed "Old Sparky") that was used before the implementation of lethal injection.

The execution chamber proper is approximately 8' X 12' and is occupied by a gurney outfitted with sheets and pillow. Continuing through the execution chamber, there is a holding room off the right side as viewed from the observation room with a single-cell complex. The "Death Watch" cell consists of a standard holding cell, with a sink, toilet, and shower included within the one-cell complex. There is a small observation area immediately outside of the cell where two corrections officers are assigned to 24/7 security detail once an inmate is placed on "Death Watch."

There is a private observation room with one-way glass directly behind the execution room that is accessed through the holding room. This room is where the old electrical supply panel is housed that energized the formerly used electric chair.  Also, there are two circular line ports through the block wall where chemical lines are fed to the execution room. This room is where the executioners, warden, and other authorized personnel maintain watch over the execution and the administration of the lethal injection drugs: sodium thiopental that was previously used to induce unconsciousness; pancuronium bromide (Pavulon) to cause muscle paralysis and respiratory arrest; and potassium chloride to stop the heart.

Use of pentobarbital
The 50th convicted killer executed in Georgia since 1973 was Roy Willard Blankenship on June 23, 2011; it was the first execution carried out using a new sedative, pentobarbital, replacing sodium thiopental. In March 2011, agents with the U.S. Drug Enforcement Administration seized Georgia's supply of sodium thiopental, which attorneys for several death row inmates said Georgia had improperly imported from a pharmacy operating out of the back of a driving school in England. Hospira Inc. of Illinois, the only U.S. company that manufactured sodium thiopental, said in January it would stop making the drug after Italy, where it planned to move production, objected because the European Union has banned the export of drugs used for death penalty.

Several states have either run out of supplies of sodium thiopental or switched to pentobarbital, a barbiturate often used to euthanize animals.

Controversial executions
The most recent controversial execution that gained national attention was carried out on September 21, 2011 at the Georgia Diagnostic and Classification Prison. Convicted murderer Troy Anthony Davis was the 
29th inmate to be executed by lethal injection in the State of Georgia and the 52nd convicted murderer to be executed since 1976.

Scheduled and stayed executions
Condemned murderer Marcus Ray Johnson was scheduled to be executed exactly two weeks after Troy Anthony Davis in the same execution chamber.  Johnson was scheduled to be executed on Wednesday, October 5 at 7 pm ET.  On Tuesday, October 4, 2011, Dougherty County Superior Court Judge Willie Lockett halted the execution amid discovery evidence presented to the defense by Law Enforcement. The judge ruled that further DNA testing should be completed on the new evidence prior to the execution moving forward. The Dougherty County Superior Court ordered the execution of convicted murderer Marcus Ray Johnson. The court ordered the Georgia Department of Corrections to carry out the execution on a date between November 19–26, 2015. Commissioner Homer Bryson has set the date for Thursday, November 19, at the Georgia Diagnostic and Classification Prison in Jackson at 7 p.m. Johnson was convicted in 1998 for the murder of Angela Sizemore and executed on November 19, 2015.  Johnson was the 36th inmate put to death by lethal injection.

The Paulding County Superior Court ordered the execution of convicted murderer Nicholas Cody Tate. The Court ordered the Georgia Department of Corrections to carry out the execution on a date between January 31, 2012 and February 7, 2012. Former Commissioner Brian Owens has set the date for January 31, 2012 at the Georgia Diagnostic and Classification Prison in Jackson at 7:00 p.m. Tate was convicted of the 2001 murder of Chrissie Williams and her 3-year-old daughter, Katelyn Williams. Approximately two hours prior to the scheduled 7 PM execution on 31-January-2012, a judge issued a stay of execution. Tate reversed course and decided to fight the state in a move that could delay his execution for years, said Lauren Kane, a spokeswoman for Georgia Attorney General Sam Olens. "He apparently decided he wanted to appeal," Kane added. Tate was originally convicted of the 2001 murder of a mother and her toddler daughter during a home invasion.

On April 17, 2012, The State Board of Pardons and Paroles granted a stay of up to 90 days to condemned inmate Daniel Greene. In a statement released, the board said the stay was issued to allow more time to examine claims from Greene's representatives at a hearing. The board says they may lift the stay and grant clemency, commuting Greene's death sentence to life in prison, or they may deny clemency.  Daniel Greene's execution delay was the third consecutive delay of a scheduled execution of a condemned inmate in the Georgia Correctional System. On April 20, 2012, The Georgia Board of Pardons and Paroles granted clemency to Greene, reducing his original death sentence to life without the possibility for parole. Greene's was the fourth death sentence commuted by the five-member board since 2002 and the first since 2008. Greene was originally sentenced to death in the 1992 murder of Bernard Walker as Walker was trying to lend aid to a store clerk who had been robbed and stabbed by Greene.  Greene is currently serving his life sentence at Ware State Prison.

On July 19, 2013, Warren Lee Hill was granted a stay of execution for a fourth consecutive time only an hour before his scheduled execution time. Hill was originally tried, convicted, and sentenced to life in prison for the murder of his girlfriend by shooting her 11 times. In 1990, Hill murdered another inmate with a nail-studded board at Lee State Prison in Leesburg, Georgia. Hill was tried, convicted, and sentenced to death by lethal injection for his second murder.  On January 27, 2015, Hill was executed by lethal injection at the Georgia Diagnostic and Classification Prison in Jackson, Georgia. He was pronounced dead at 7:55 P.M.

Brian Nichols
Atlanta courthouse shooter Brian Nichols was transferred here to partake in his diagnostics for the Georgia DOC. Nichols poses a high escape risk. Due to this classification, Nichols is periodically moved within the prison complex so that he does not become accustomed to one area or established prison area routines. This information was provided by a prison official who is authorized to release this information.

Georgia Department of Corrections
Before GDC decided to relocate its headquarters to the former Tift College, in the 2000s it considered moving its headquarters to GDCP.

Executions in the State of Georgia
 List of people executed in Georgia (U.S. state)

Notable inmates

Current
Brian Nichols (born 1971), spree killer
Reinaldo Rivera (born 1963), serial killer

Former
 Greg McMichael (born 1955), one of the convicted killers of Ahmaud Arbery; moved to Augusta State Medical Prison in January 2023
Travis McMichael (born 1986), one of the murderers of Ahmaud Arbery; moved to Hays State Prison in January 2023
William Bryan (born 1969), assisted the McMichaels in the Murder of Ahmaud Arbery; moved to Valdosta State Prison in January 2023
Ashley Diamond (born 1978), transgender civil rights activist convicted of several crimes; was held briefly at GDCP
Gary Hilton (born 1946), serial killer; was held during trial
William J. Pierce (1931–2020), serial killer; died at GDCP

Executed
Jack Alderman (1951–2008), murdered his wife; executed by lethal injection
Andrew Brannan (1948–2015), convicted of killing Kyle Dinkheller; executed by lethal injection
Robert Butts (1977–2018) and Marion Wilson (1976–2019), convicted of killing Donovan Parks; executed by lethal injection 
Troy Davis (1968–2011), murdered a cop; executed by lethal injection
Andrew Grant DeYoung (1974–2011), murdered his parents and sister; executed by lethal injection
Melbert Ford (1960–2010), double murderer; executed by lethal injection
Kelly Gissendaner (1968–2015), murdered her husband; executed by lethal injection
William Henry Hance (1951–1994), serial killer; executed by electric chair
Brandon Astor Jones (1943–2016), murderer; executed by lethal injection
William Earl Lynd (1955–2008), murdered his girlfriend; executed by lethal injection
Stephen Anthony Mobley (1965–2005), murdered a college student; executed by lethal injection
Curtis Osborne (1970–2008), double murderer; executed by lethal injection
Brandon Rhode (1979–2010) and Daniel Lucas (1978–2016), convicted of killing the Moss family; executed by lethal injection
John Eldon Smith (1930–1983), double murderer; executed by electric chair

References

External links

Georgia Diagnostic and Classification Prison - Georgia Department of Corrections
Georgia execution chamber photo

Prisons in Georgia (U.S. state)
Capital punishment in Georgia (U.S. state)
Buildings and structures in Butts County, Georgia
Execution sites in the United States
1968 establishments in Georgia (U.S. state)